Vater wider Willen is a German television series.

See also
List of German television series

External links
 

1995 German television series debuts
2002 German television series endings
German-language television shows
Das Erste original programming